The Thomas Benton Hoover House is a historic house located in Fossil, Oregon, United States. The house is constructed in two stories with clapboarded outer walls. It was built in 1882 by Thomas Benton Hoover, an early Euro-American settler and prominent Fossil citizen. Hoover was Fossil's first merchant (along with a partner), mayor, justice of the peace, and postmaster, as well as an early county commissioner and director of schools. He named Fossil for a paleontological find on his property in 1876.

The house was listed on the National Register of Historic Places in 1978.

See also
National Register of Historic Places listings in Wheeler County, Oregon

References

Houses on the National Register of Historic Places in Oregon
Houses in Wheeler County, Oregon
Houses completed in 1882
National Register of Historic Places in Wheeler County, Oregon
1882 establishments in Oregon